Vedat Tutuk (born 5 October 1963) is a Turkish boxer. He competed in the men's bantamweight event at the 1988 Summer Olympics.

References

1963 births
Living people
Turkish male boxers
Olympic boxers of Turkey
Boxers at the 1988 Summer Olympics
Place of birth missing (living people)
Mediterranean Games gold medalists for Turkey
Mediterranean Games medalists in boxing
Competitors at the 1987 Mediterranean Games
Bantamweight boxers
20th-century Turkish people